Villains is a 2019 American black comedy horror film  written and directed by Dan Berk and Robert Olsen. It stars Bill Skarsgård, Maika Monroe, Blake Baumgartner, Jeffrey Donovan, and Kyra Sedgwick.

The film had its world premiere at South by Southwest on March 9, 2019. It was released in the United States on September 20, 2019, by Gunpowder & Sky.

Plot
Wearing animal masks, two lovebirds Mickey and Jules clumsily rob a gas station and take off, celebrating their last sting before moving to Florida. While driving through the woods, their car runs out of gas. Jules spots a mailbox, and the couple discovers a large, isolated house. They see a vehicle in the garage, but the house appears empty. After breaking down the front door they head down to the basement looking for a gas can, and discover a small girl, dirty and mute, chained to a column.

They return upstairs to find a way to release the girl, but meet the surprised homeowners George, Gloria, and their infant son Ethan. George and Gloria calmly offer money, but Jules is adamant to know why the little girl is downstairs. George explains that their "Sweetiepie" is down there for discipline. Mickey threatens them with his gun, but George defuses the tension and convinces them to sit down and talk. Mickey keeps his gun cocked while George calmly offers them the chance to simply take their vehicle and leave, stating he would be far less likely to call the police for the car than if they kidnapped Sweetiepie. Mickey rejects their offer and backs up Jules' demand to free the girl, forcing George at gunpoint to unlock her.

Free of her chains, Mickey tries to coax and reason with Sweetiepie to come forward, but she bites his hand. George knocks him unconscious, and Gloria restrains Jules. Mickey wakes up tied to a bed with Gloria dancing in front of him in lingerie, but she is upset when he does not get an erection. The next time Gloria visits him, Mickey apologizes. He seduces her and convinces her to uncuff him, and then pushes her away and escapes. As Mickey begins to escape, he recoils from a close gun shot. George shoots again, hitting him in the leg, and ties him up in the basement with Jules. Mickey realizes that he can use Jules' tongue ring to pick the locks on their handcuffs, and after ripping it out, he uncuffs her. Jules attempts to pick the lock of Mickey's cuff, but she breaks her tongue ring and is forced to go for help alone. Sweetiepie points to the laundry chute as an escape.

George realizes Jules has escaped and beats Mickey for information. Mickey lies and tells George that Jules has already left the house and is waiting for Mickey to join her at their meeting spot and she will go to the police if Mickey does not show up in an hour, so George agrees to let Mickey go. Jules hides in Ethan's nursery upstairs, discovering that he is actually a porcelain doll wrapped in a blanket. She overhears Mickey and George talking downstairs and misunderstands their conversation to be as George about to kill Mickey, rather than let him go. Jules uses 'Ethan' as leverage, and coming out onto the landing she threatens to drop the doll, demanding they let Mickey go. An enraged Gloria shoots at her, causing Jules to drop the doll, and its ceramic head shatters on the floor.

The captives are duct taped at the dining table while Gloria cooks a meal. George explains that Gloria has always wanted a child, but he was unable to give her one. They kidnapped Sweetiepie to be their child, but Sweetiepie only reminded Gloria of the children she could never have. Gloria wanted Sweetiepie killed, but George thought locking her in the basement was more merciful. Gloria tells Jules that when she was a little girl, her mother gave her 'Ethan' as a gift and died shortly after. Mickey and Jules begin to feel woozy, having eaten food drugged with what was found in Jules' bag. George explains that he and Gloria will give Mickey and Jules heroin when they pass out, then report them as two drug-addicts who overdosed while robbing them. As Mickey and Jules begin to lose consciousness, a police officer knocks on the door to inform George that the robbers' car was spotted nearby. The officer asks to come in and look around, but the dining room shows no sign of Mickey and Jules, who have been hidden in a bedroom by Gloria. The officer heads down to the basement, but gets called away before seeing Sweetiepie.

Jules awakens from her drug overdose, and after spotting her bag across the room, crawls to it and snorts a bump of cocaine. Regaining her strength, she puts cocaine into Mickey's nostrils to give him a 'boost' and wake him. George and Gloria return, finding the room empty and the window open, head outside to search the surrounding property. Mickey and Jules never left the house and only tricked George and Gloria into thinking they had. They use the opportunity to grab Sweetiepie and take the homeowners car keys. George returns before they can escape, and stands in the driveway with his gun. Mickey warns Jules and Sweetiepie to duck and drives forward, running over George and receiving fatal gunshot wounds in the process. George, injured but alive, pulls Jules out of the car and attempts to strangle her, but Sweetiepie picks up his gun and fatally shoots George through the head. Gloria comes out to see her blood-soaked husband and collapses next to him in maniacal joy, insisting he is just resting and they are about to leave to start a new life. Jules and Sweetiepie set off on foot and hitch a ride to Florida, where they start new lives there.

Cast
 Bill Skarsgård as Mickey
 Maika Monroe as Jules
 Blake Baumgartner as Sweetiepie
 Kyra Sedgwick as Gloria
 Jeffrey Donovan as George
 Noah Robbins as Nick
 Danny Johnson as Officer Wells
 Nikolas Kontomanolis as Sam

Production
Dan Berk and Robert Olsen's script for Villains was featured on the 2016 Black List, an annual list of the most-liked unproduced screenplays of that year. Development began with the casting of Bill Skarsgård and Maika Monroe in the lead roles in March 2018. Two weeks later, Kyra Sedgwick and Jeffrey Donovan joined the cast, and principal photography began that same week in New York City. On April 13, 2018, Donovan posted on Twitter that he had wrapped for Villains.

Release
The film had its world premiere at South by Southwest on March 9, 2019. Shortly after, Gunpowder & Sky acquired distribution rights to the film, with the intent to release it in mid-2019. The film was released on September 20, 2019.

Reception
The site's consensus reads, "Led by a quartet of strong performances, Villains offers genre fans a delightfully dark thriller with a sharp comic streak."

References

External links
 

2019 films
2019 comedy horror films
2019 thriller films
2010s comedy thriller films
American comedy horror films
American comedy thriller films
Films scored by Andrew Hewitt
2010s English-language films
2010s American films